Hipparchus, anglicized hipparch, was the title of an ancient Greek cavalry officer, commanding a hipparchia (unit of about 500 horsemen); two such units were commanded by an epihipparchos.

Ancient Greek military terminology
Military ranks of ancient Greece
Military ranks of ancient Macedon
Cavalry